was a Japanese actress and singer. She appeared in more than twenty films from 1950 to 1964. She was married to film director Tatsumi Kumashiro from 1955 to 1967.

She died in 2014.

Filmography

References

External links
 

1931 births
2014 deaths
Japanese film actresses
People from Tokyo